Petra Taušová is a retired Czech football goalkeeper, who currently serves as a Team Manager at Slavia Prague U-12.

She has been a member of the Czech national team.

References

1983 births
Living people
Czech women's footballers
Czech Republic women's international footballers
People from Rakovník
FC Slovan Liberec players
FC Hradec Králové players
Expatriate women's footballers in Germany
Czech expatriate footballers
Czech expatriate sportspeople in Germany
Women's association football goalkeepers
SK Slavia Praha (women) players
AC Sparta Praha (women) players
Czech Women's First League players
Sportspeople from the Central Bohemian Region